(David) Gwyther (Broome) Irwin (7 May  1931 – 18 October 2008) was a British abstract artist born in Basingstoke, Hampshire, who had lived much of his life in north Cornwall. He was educated in Dorset, at Goldsmiths College and at the Central School of Art in London 1951–1954. Irwin first came to prominence in 1957 with an exhibition at Gallery One, and another at Gimpel Fils in 1959. In 1964, he represented Britain at the Venice Biennale, along with Joe Tilson, Bernard Meadows and Roger Hilton. In 1960, he married Elizabeth Gowlett and they had two sons and one daughter.

His most famous artworks consisted of pictures assembled from newsprint and fragments of advertisements on paper, which he collected from the streets with his wife, and which were then worked up into collages often of fine delicacy and quite subtle shades. Some of his later works also used string, wood shavings, chalk and paint.

"Gwyther Irwin's latest collages...are evidently miracles of patient assembly...they set out to achieve the subtlest and slowest possible shifts in tonality from umber darkness to creamy light and back again. The patience, the subtlety, the muted gradations of every effect combine to produce an atmosphere of studied beauty." (The Times, 18 September 1959)

In the 1960s he taught at art schools in Hornsey, Corsham and Chelsea before becoming head of fine art at Brighton polytechnic between 1969 and 1984.

Exhibitions
Gallery One, 1957
Redfern Gallery, Metavisual Tachiste Abstract, 1957
Institute of Contemporary Arts, "Three Collagists," 1958
Gimpel Fils, 1959
Situation, London, 1960
Paris Biennale, 1960
Biennale des Jeunes, Paris, 1961
The Art of Assemblage, MoMA, New York, 1961
Gimpel Fils, 1962
Gimpel Fils, 1963,
Venice Biennale, 1964
Recent British Painting, Tate Gallery, London, 1967
Two one-man exhibitions in 1975 & 1978
Kettle’s Yard, Cambridge, 1981
Retrospective, Gimpel Fils, 1987
John Jones Gallery, 1992
Barbican Art Gallery, 1993
Royal Cornwall Museum, Truro, 1995
West of England Academy, Bristol, 1996
Tate Britain, 2004
Redfern Gallery & JHW Fine Art, London, 2006
Lemon Street Gallery, Truro, scheduled for February 2009 will now become a memorial tribute.

Bibliography
 Gwyther Irwin, Collage, Gimpel Fils, London, 1962, ASIN B0007KED1A
 Alan Bowness, Gwyther Irwin, Quadrum Books, Bruxelles, 1964, ASIN B0007KELU8
 Roger Hilton, Gwyther Irwin, Bernard Meadows, Joe Tilson, An exhibition catalogue, with illustrations, Stedelijk Museum, Amsterdam, 1965
 Gwyther Irwin: work in progress 1957-1967, [exhibition] 5–30 September 1967, Gimpel Fils, London, 1967, ASIN B0007JX2NQ
 Gwyther Irwin, 7 April to 2 May 1970, Gimpel Fils, London, 1970
 Nicholas Wadley, Gwyther Irwin a Retrospective, London, Gimpel Fils. 1987
 Gwyther Irwin, Recent Paintings, 15 February-17 March 1994, Redfern Gallery, London, 1994

See also
Mimmo Rotella

External links
Gwyther Irwin at JHW fine arts
Gwyther Irwin at Tate modern
Gwyther Irwin: painter whose art drew his Cornish upbringing (Obituary), The Times, 25 October 2008
Magdalen Evans, Gwyther Irwin: Artist and teacher who forged a reputation as Britain's foremost collagist, The Independent, 24 October 2008

1931 births
2008 deaths
Artists from Hampshire
Academics of the University of Brighton
Collage artists
People from Basingstoke
Alumni of the Central School of Art and Design